Fort Ebey State Park is a public recreation area occupying the site of former Fort Ebey on the west side of Whidbey Island,  west of Coupeville in Island County, Washington, United States. The state park covers  overlooking the Strait of Juan de Fuca and lies within the Ebey's Landing National Historical Reserve. It is managed by the Washington State Parks and Recreation Commission.

History
Fort Ebey was built on Partridge Point in 1942 as a World War II coastal defense near the mouth of Puget Sound. The fort was named for Isaac Neff Ebey, a pioneering homesteader on Whidbey Island. The fort included a battery of two 6-inch guns that were later cut up for scrap.

The state first acquired the land through the purchase of 204 acres from the federal government in 1965. Additional acquisitions were made between 1968 and 1974, adding nearly 24 acres to the site. The park was further increased through a purchase from the Department of Natural Resources and a land swap arrangement with a private owner in 1990 and 1997. The park opened in 1981.

Activities and amenities
The park includes  of saltwater shoreline, the  freshwater Lake Pondilla, and 25 miles of trails. A  stretch of the Pacific Northwest National Scenic Trail crosses the park. Park activities include picnicking, camping, fishing, beachcombing, and paragliding.

See also
United States home front during World War II

References

External links

Fort Ebey State Park Washington State Parks and Recreation Commission
Fort Ebey State Park Map Washington State Parks and Recreation Commission

State parks of Washington (state)
Casey
Ebey's Landing National Historical Reserve
Parks in Island County, Washington
Protected areas established in 1965
History of Island County, Washington
United States home front during World War II
1965 establishments in Washington (state)